VTV2 is a Vietnamese television channel owned and operated by state-run VTV Network.

Launched on 1 January 1990, VTV2 is dedicated to the broadcast of education and cultural programs.  Since 1 May 2020, the channel has broadcast for 24/7. In 1993, Vietnam Television signed an accord with Canal France Television of France Télévisions to broadcast selected programs of the latter channel. This channel has broadcasting HDTV version from 19 May 2015.

After VTV6 stopped broadcasting, VTV2 broadcast some V-League matches live. Starting from 2023 season, VTV2 will take the VTV6's role to broadcast V-league matches live (along with VTV5 and VTV Cần Thơ).

Broadcast hours
 1990-1992: 14:00 to 24:00 (Monday-Friday); 08:00 to 24:00 (Saturday-Sunday)
 February 1992: 12:00 to 24:00 (Monday-Friday); 08:00 to 24:00 (Saturday-Sunday)
 July 1992: 11:00 to 24:00 (Monday-Friday); 06:00 to 24:00 (Saturday-Sunday)
 October 1992 – 1993: 09:00 to 24:00 (Monday-Friday); 06:00 to 24:00 (Saturday-Sunday)
 1993-1994: 06:00 to 12:00
 1994-2005: 05:30 to 24:00
 2005-2011 and 19 March 2020 – 30 April 2020: 05:00 to 24:00
 1 January 2012 – 18 March 2020 and 1 May 2020 – present: 24 hours per day.

Programming on VTV2
(Notice: This channel broadcast time is UTC+07:00)
 Details :  List of broadcasts of Vietnam Television (VTV)

Current programming:
2022 FIFA World Cup
2022 AFF Championship
Miss Universe 2022
2023 V.League 1
Motion News 24h (Chuyển động 24h) (18:00, since 10 October 2014)
World Discovery (Khám phá thế giới)
 Sports (every day):
VTV Sports News (11:15)
360 degree Sports (360 độ thể thao) (22:40)
Films (every day):
Vietnamese drama reruns (11:45)
Foreign drama (19:00 and 19:50)
Change Life - Thay đổi cuộc sống
Family Time (Giờ gia đình)
Discover Journey (Hành trình khám phá)
Happiness for Everyhome (Hạnh phúc đến mọi nhà)
Go! VTV (Đi VTV)
4 Season Love (Bốn mùa yêu thương)
Beauty 24/7 (Đẹp 24/7)
Healthy for Everybody (Sức khỏe cho mọi người)
Vietnam Discovery (Khám phá Việt Nam)
Transport Light (Đèn giao thông)
News For Hearing Disabilities (22:00, rerun of VTV1's 19:00 news bulletin, aimed at deaf people with sign language)
Technology Life (Nhịp sống công nghệ)
The Amazing Bus (Chuyến xe buýt kỳ thú)

Former programming:
Pokémon: XY (28 September 2015 - 9 July 2016)
Disney Club (Walt Disney cartoon block) (16 January 2016 - 13 November 2016)
Sex and the City (Chuyện ấy là chuyện nhỏ) (1 August 2016 - 7 December 2016)
Pokémon: XY: Kalos Quest (11 July 2016 - 11 May 2017)
Yo-kai Watch (Đồng hồ yêu quái) (2 April 2016 - 20 May 2017) 
How I Met Your Mother (Khi bố gặp mẹ) (8 December 2016 - 26 September 2017)

See also
 Vietnam Television
 List of broadcasts of Vietnam Television (VTV)

Notes

References

External links
 VTV Official Web
 List of broadcasts of Vietnam Television (VTV)

Vietnam Television
Television channels and stations established in 1990
Documentary television channels
Educational and instructional television channels
Television networks in Vietnam
Agricultural television stations